Vogue la galère is a 1973 French film directed by Raymond Rouleau. It is based on the play Vogue la galère by Marcel Aymé

Cast
 Claude Dauphin - Le capitaine
 Robert Hossein - Simon
 Henry Czarniak - Hardouin
 Gérard Lartigau - Lazare
 Mario David - Hersandieu
 Xavier Depraz - Comité
 Hubert Deschamps - Nicaise
 Guy Di Rigo - Montbusard
 Pierre Duncan - Main-Gauche
 Marc Eyraud - Le défroqué
 René Havard - Petit Rouquier
 Isabelle Huppert - Clotilde
 Micheline Luccioni - Marion
 Antoine Marin - Argousier
 Pierre Massimi - Le lieutenant

See also
 Isabelle Huppert on screen and stage

References

External links

1973 films
1970s French-language films
French films based on plays
Films based on works by Marcel Aymé
Films directed by Raymond Rouleau
1970s French films